Pacific Heights is a neighborhood in San Francisco, California. It has panoramic views of the Golden Gate Bridge, San Francisco Bay, the Palace of Fine Arts, Alcatraz, and the Presidio.

The Pacific Heights Residents Association defines the neighborhood as stretching from Union Street to Bush Street in the north–south direction and from Van Ness Avenue to Presidio Avenue in the east–west direction. The San Francisco Mayor's Office of Neighborhood Services defines its north–south extent more narrowly, with Green Street and California & Pine Streets serving as its boundaries. A 2013 article named Pacific Heights one of the most expensive neighborhoods in the United States. 

Pacific Heights features two parks, Lafayette and Alta Plaza. Visible to the north are the Golden Gate Bridge, the Marin Headlands, and Alcatraz Island. Visible to the south are Twin Peaks and the Sutro Tower.

Lower Pacific Heights refers to the area located south of California Street down to Post Street. While this area was previously considered part of the Western Addition, the new neighborhood designation became popularized by real estate agents in the early 1990s.

History
The neighborhood was first developed in the 1870s, with small Victorian-inspired homes built. Starting around the beginning of the 20th century, and especially after the 1906 San Francisco earthquake, many were replaced with period homes. Still residential, the area is characterized by painted Victorian style architecture.

Attractions and characteristics
The oldest building in Pacific Heights, located at 2475 Pacific Avenue, was built in 1853, though the majority of the neighborhood was built after the 1906 earthquake. The architecture of the neighborhood is varied; Victorian, Mission Revival, Edwardian, and Château styles are common.

Several countries have consulates in Pacific Heights. They include Italy, Greece, Vietnam, South Korea, China, and Germany.

Most of the neighborhood's boutiques and restaurants can be found along Fillmore Street, south of Pacific Avenue. They include stores like Athleta, Prada, Marc by Marc Jacobs, and Ralph Lauren. Other businesses in Pacific Heights are located on California and Divisadero Streets, as well as on Van Ness Avenue.

Pacific Heights is home to several schools, including the San Francisco University High School; Drew School (formerly Drew College Preparatory School); the Hamlin School; Convent of the Sacred Heart High School; Stuart Hall High School, San Francisco Waldorf School, Academy of Thought and Industry, and Town School for Boys, among others. The celebrated Grant Elementary School was open on Pacific Ave from 1922 to 1972. Its students included children of diplomats, the well to do, and the adjacent Presidio military base. Current elementary schools include Hillwood Academic Day School, which opened in 1949.

Government and infrastructure
The San Francisco Police Department Northern Station serves Pacific Heights.

Notable residents

Larry Ellison: co-founder and chairman of Oracle Corporation
Gordon Getty: billionaire businessman and composer
Ann Getty: philanthropist, publisher, anthropologist, socialite
Jonathan Ive: former chief designer at Apple Inc.
Jay Paul: billionaire real estate developer
Nancy Pelosi, former Speaker of the United States House of Representatives, and her husband Paul Pelosi 
Danielle Steel: author
Peter Thiel: co-founder of PayPal

Gallery

See also

List of hills in San Francisco

References

Notes

External links

phra-sf.org: Pacific Heights Residents Association
The San Francisco Chronicle: Pacific Heights (reference article)
The San Francisco Chronicle: "The Perfect Pacific Heights Commute, the scenes from Pacific Heights to Lucas Film in the Presidio"
Flickr group—Pacific Heights Neighborhood (photographs pool)

Neighborhoods in San Francisco
Hills of San Francisco